Ahmad Sharbini (born 21 February 1984) is a Croatian football executive and director of NK Rječina and former professional player who played as a striker.

Club career
Ahmad Sharbini began his professional career with HNK Rijeka in the Croatian Prva HNL in January 2003, when he signed his first professional contract. In the first four seasons with the club, he scored 39 league goals and 9 cup goals. With 21 goals to his account, he was the club's leading goalscorer in the 2006–07 season. He was also the league's second top goalscorer behind Eduardo da Silva. In late 2007 and early 2008, he had stints with Al-Wahda FC (Abu Dhabi) and FC Luzern. In mid-2008, Sharbini returned to Rijeka, and in the 2008–09 season, with 17 goals in all competitions, he was the club's joint top goalscorer with his brother Anas Sharbini.

After the first league match in the new season, on 13 August 2009, he signed for Hajduk Split with his brother Anas. During his three years with Hajduk, Ahmad scored only 5 goals and most of the time struggled to make the starting line-up. Following his departure from Hajduk, he had three short stints in late 2012 and 2013, with NK Istra 1961, Al-Wehda Club (Mecca) and NK Jedinstvo Bihać, respectively. Following an 18-month break, since August 2015, Ahmad has been playing for NK Rječina in Croatia's fifth tier. Since mid-2014, he has also been serving as the club's chairman. In 2016 he joined NK Grobničan for one season period.

International career
Sharbini played in the 2001 FIFA U-17 World Championship in Trinidad and Tobago. He also played for Croatia national under-21 football team. He was capped last on 15 August 2006, against Italy national under-21 football team.

Career statistics

Personal life
Sharbini is the older brother of fellow retired footballer Anas Sharbini. He is of Albanian, Croatian and Palestinian descent. He was born in Rijeka to a local Albanian Croatian mother and Palestinian father, Jamal Al-Sharbini, who is from Damascus, Syria.

Achievements
Ahmad Sharbini is HNK Rijeka's leading goalscorer in the Croatian First Football League and the Croatian Football Cup with 54 and 14 goals to his account, respectively.

Brothers Ahmad and Anas Sharbini are the only siblings to have scored a hat-trick each in a single match in top-tier European football leagues. In the first round fixture of the 2009–10 Croatian First Football League season against NK Lokomotiva, the brothers took turns. Ahmad opened the scoring after four minutes, Anas doubled the lead in the 27th minute and Ahmad made it 3–0 in the 35th minute. In the second half Anas converted a penalty in 51st minute, Ahmad completed his hat-trick in the 68th minute and two minutes later Anas scored his third goal.

Honours
HNK Rijeka
Croatian Football Cup: 2005, 2006

HNK Hajduk Split
Croatian Football Cup: 2010

Grobničan
4. HNL – Zapad: 2017–18

Records
Most goals for HNK Rijeka in all official matches since 1974–75: 70 goals
Most goals for HNK Rijeka in Croatian First Football League: 54 goals
Most goals for HNK Rijeka in Croatian Football Cup: 14 goals
Most goals for HNK Rijeka in Adriatic derby: 7 goals
Most goals for HNK Rijeka in one season in Croatian First Football League: 21 goals (shared with Andrej Kramarić)
Most goals for HNK Rijeka scored against single opposition: 9 goals 
Most braces for HNK Rijeka: 10 (including hat-tricks)
Most hat-tricks for HNK Rijeka: 4
Second all-time league goalscorer for HNK Rijeka: 54 goals

References

External links
 

1984 births
Living people
Footballers from Rijeka
Croatian people of Palestinian descent
Croatian people of Albanian descent
Croatian Muslims
Association football forwards
Croatian footballers
Croatia youth international footballers
Croatia under-21 international footballers
HNK Rijeka players
Al Wahda FC players
FC Luzern players
HNK Hajduk Split players
NK Istra 1961 players
Al-Wehda Club (Mecca) players
NK Jedinstvo Bihać players
NK Grobničan players
Croatian Football League players
UAE Pro League players
Swiss Super League players
Saudi Professional League players
First League of the Federation of Bosnia and Herzegovina players
Croatian expatriate footballers
Expatriate footballers in the United Arab Emirates
Croatian expatriate sportspeople in the United Arab Emirates
Expatriate footballers in Switzerland
Croatian expatriate sportspeople in Switzerland
Expatriate footballers in Saudi Arabia
Croatian expatriate sportspeople in Saudi Arabia
Expatriate footballers in Bosnia and Herzegovina
Croatian expatriate sportspeople in Bosnia and Herzegovina